Inisai Toga was a Fijian rugby league footballer who played for the St George Dragons in the 1970s.

Originally from Fijian rugby union, Inisai (sometimes spelt Inosi) Toga and his older brother Apisai Toga both played second row for the St George Dragons. Inisai followed his brother to St. George in 1969 and played six seasons with St. George between 1969-1974, mainly in reserve grade. He played in the 1973 Wills Cup Final with St. George, only a few weeks after his brother Apisai died of tetanus poisoning at the age of 27. He retired in 1975.

References

St. George Dragons players
Fijian rugby league players
Living people
Year of birth missing (living people)
Rugby league props
Rugby league second-rows